was a Japanese actor, voice actor, narrator and director of audiography credited for voicing many anime and video game characters. Tsujitani used to be affiliated with Sigma Seven. He married Kumiko Watanabe in 2012. He died of a stroke on October 17, 2018.

Biography

Filmography

Anime
Mobile Suit Gundam 0080: War in the Pocket (1989), Bernard Wiseman
3×3 Eyes (1991), Yakumo Fujii
The Brave Fighter of Sun Fighbird (1991–1992), Guard Rescue
Mobile Suit Gundam F91 (1991), Seabook Arno
Otaku no Video (1991), (Ken Kubo)
Video Girl Ai (1992), (Takashi Niimai)
Irresponsible Captain Tylor (1993), Tylor
Genocyber (1994), Ryuu
YuYu Hakusho (1994), (Itsuki)
Saint Tail (1995), Noguchi
Escaflowne (1996), Jajuka
Grander Musashi (1997), Sugeru
Hajime no Ippo (2000), Ryuichi Hayami
InuYasha (2001), Miroku
PaRappa the Rapper (2001), Matt's Father
Maburaho (2003), Akai Haruaki
Kyou Kara Maou (2004–2009), Shouma Shibuya
Blood+ (2005–2006), Solomon Goldsmith
Eureka Seven (2005), Dewey Novak
Guardian of the Sacred Spirit (2007), Tanda
Code:Breaker (2012), Goutoku Sakurakouji
Kokkoku: Moment by Moment (2018), Sakafumi Yukawa
My Sexual Harassment series 1 (xxxx), (Youhei Fujita)
Nurarihyon no Mago (xxxx), (Hihi)
Ranma ½ (xxxx), (Hiroshi, Tatewaki Kuno (2nd temporary voice and OVA 13), Yasukichi, Crepe King, and Sotatsu)
RG Veda (xxxx), (Ten-oh)
Salamander (xxxx), (Dan)
Sengoku Basara (xxxx), (Azai Nagamasa)
Slam Dunk (xxxx), (Kenji Fujima)
Violinist of Hameln (xxxx), (Raiel)

Drama CDs
Kami-sama wa Ijiwaru Janai (Yuuya Hoshino)
Katsuai series 2: Bakuren (Yoshiki Takatou)
Koikina Yatsura 1 - 3 & side story (Mizuki Seo)
Mirage of Blaze series 2: Saiai no Anata he (Nobutsuna Naoe)
My Sexual Harassment series 1 (Youhei Fujita)
Okane ga nai series 3: Kawaige Nai (Misao Kuba)
Okane ga nai series 4: Okane ja Kaenai (Misao Kuba)
Pearl series 1: Ijiwaru na Pearl (Tomoaki Matsumiya)
Pearl series 2: Yokubari na Pearl (Tomoaki Matsumiya)
Pearl series 3: Wagamama na Pearl (Tomoaki Matsumiya)
Pearl series 4: Kimagure na Pearl (Tomoaki Matsumiya)

Anime CDs
Kouji Tsujitani feat. Houko Kuwashima and Kumiko Watanabe in 風のなかへ - Into the Wind (Kaze no Naka e) -->

Dubbing
The Matrix Revolutions, Seraph (Collin Chou)
Psycho, Norman Bates (Anthony Perkins)
Super Mario Bros., Luigi (John Leguizamo)
Training Day, Officer Jake Hoyt (Ethan Hawke)
The Matrix Reloaded, Seraph (Collin Chou), Agent Johnson (Daniel Bernhardt)

In The Credits Koji Tsujitani's Death In The Stop Motion Anime Compilation Movie

References

External links
 
Koji Tsujitani at Hitoshi Doi

1962 births
2018 deaths
Japanese male stage actors
Japanese male video game actors
Japanese male voice actors
Male voice actors from Tokyo Metropolis
People from Kodaira, Tokyo
Sigma Seven voice actors
20th-century Japanese male actors
21st-century Japanese male actors